Bold (a term derived from kobold) was a German sonar decoy, used by U-boats during the Second World War from 1942 onwards. It was launched by an ejector system colloquially referred to as Pillenwerfer (English: "pill thrower").

When mixed with seawater, the calcium hydride produced large quantities of hydrogen which bubbled out of the container, creating a false sonar target. The device lasted 20 to 25 minutes.

The Royal Navy called it SBT (Submarine Bubble Target).

See also
 Sieglinde (decoy)

External links
 Sonar decoys at uboataces.com

Sonar decoys
Weapons countermeasures
Sonar
U-boats